Raz-Lee Security, Inc. is an international organization that provides data security solutions for IBM's Power i servers.

The company's clients include Fiat, Agfa, Teva Pharmaceuticals, Avnet, AIG, Dun & Bradstreet and the Israel branch of American insurance company American International Group, among others.

History 
Founded in 1983, the company was formerly headquartered in Herzliya, Israel. By 1992, 33% of the company's products were being sold in the United States, and from 1994 to 1996 its business there, where it had offices in Nanuet, New York, dramatically increased, though its primary purchasers were still spread through Europe, the Middle East and Africa. As of 2009, the company is headquartered in Nanuet, with a research and development facility in Israel. The company also has offices in Israel and Italy and maintains a Technical Support and US Account Management center in San Francisco.

iSecurity Suite
The company's best known product consists of more than 15 individual products intended to protect and monitor information assets against insider threat and unauthorized external access.

In March 2020, Raz-Lee brought its Interface software to the next level with iSecurity Web, a new product that effectively operates the standard iSecurity GUI in a web browser. The app has been reviewed on browsers such as Chrome, Firefox and Edge, and also operates for desktop computers and tablets.

In August 2020, Raz-Lee released an attack simulator for its iSecurity Anti-Ransomware product, enabling users to test how their systems would react to both known and new ransomware attacks.

References

External links
IT Jungle - Raz-Lee Adds Object-Level Security to i OS Security Suite

Computer security software companies
Software companies based in New York (state)
Software companies of Israel
Software companies of the United States